This is a list of the candidates in the next Belgian regional elections, to be held in 2014.

Brussels Capital Region Parliament

Language groups

Dutch-speaking (17 seats)
Major parties:

French-speaking (72 seats)
Major parties:

Minor parties:

Flemish Parliament

Constituencies

Antwerp (33 seats)
Major parties:

Minor parties:

Brussels Capital Region (6 seats)
Major parties:

Minor parties:

East Flanders (27 seats)
Major parties:

Minor parties:

Flemish Brabant (20 seats)
Major parties:

Minor parties:

Limburg (16 seats)
Major parties:

Minor parties:

West Flanders (22 seats)
Major parties:

Minor parties:

German-speaking Community Parliament (25 seats)

Major parties:

Walloon Parliament

Constituencies

Arlon – Marche-en-Famenne – Bastenaken (3 seats)
Major parties:

Minor parties:

Charleroi (9 seats)
Major parties:

Minor parties:

Dinant – Philippeville (4 seats)
Major parties:

Minor parties:

Huy – Waremme (4 seats)
Major parties:

Minor parties:

Liège (13 seats)
Major parties:

Minor parties:

Mons (6 seats)

Major parties:

Minor parties:

Namur (6 seats)
Major parties:

Minor parties:

Neufchâteau – Virton (2 seats)
Major parties:

Minor parties:

Nivelles (8 seats)
Major parties:

Minor parties:

Soignies (4 seats)
Major parties:

Minor parties:

Thuin (3 seats)
Major parties:

Minor parties:

Tournai – Ath – Mouscron (7 seats)
Major parties:

Minor parties:

Verviers (6 seats)
Major parties:

Minor parties:

2014